Deceuninck is the name of an entrepreneurial family from West Flanders who founded several companies with their name. In 1985 the company went public on the Brussels stock exchange (now Euronext), and since 2000 the company has been called Deceuninck NV. 
 
Founded in 1937, with its headquarters in Hooglede-Gits, the Deceuninck Group operates in over 90 countries and has subsidiaries across Europe, North America and Asia, including the United States, United Kingdom, Russia and Turkey. It was listed on the Brussels Stock Exchange in 1985.

Cycling
Deceuninck sponsors Alpecin–Deceuninck and Fenix-Deceuninck, two Belgian UCI WorldTeam cycling teams. This includes sponsoring the  mountain bike and cyclocross teams and nurturing both young talent and female cyclists. Headed by Mathieu van der Poel, the team primarily focuses on success in the spring classics. Yet, with sprinters like Jasper Philipsen, the team also aspires to capture stage wins in the Grand Tours.

References

External links
Official Deceuninck site
Official Twinson site
Euronext
 Business Week
 Financial Times

Companies based in West Flanders
Manufacturing companies established in 1937
Hooglede
Belgian companies established in 1937